Daniel Doura (born 9 August 1957) is an Argentine composer of classical music. Considered one of the Argentine composers who currently have international exposure, Doura is a graduate of the Boston Conservatory, the Massachusetts Institute of Technology and the University of Columbia, and among his teachers were John Cage, Mario Davidovsky, Chou Wen-chung, Alberto Ginastera, Luciano Berio, Tōru Takemitsu, Milton Babbitt and John Adams, among others. He received the Best Composition award from the American Society of Composers, Authors and Publishers (ASCAP) in 1985 and was a finalist for the Best Composition award from the American Academy of Arts and Sciences (AAA&S). 

In 2007, he premiered the symphonic poem Visiones patagónicas, awarded by the Argentine Music Critics Association (Spanish: Asociación de Críticos Musicales de la Argentina) as the best Argentine premiere of the year. The following year, he composed Sinfonía argentina together with the writer , a symphonic-choral work conceived on the occasion of the Argentine Bicentennial celebrations, which began with that of the May Revolution in 2010 and ended with that of the Independence in 2016. Sinfonía argentina had its Argentine premiere in 2011 at the Teatro Colón and its world premiere in 2018 in a series of performances in the Czech Republic and Germany. To present the work, Doura and Roemmers held discussion events in 14 provinces of Argentina, and in 2017 they received the "Bicentennial Edition" Gold Disc award at the Embassy of the Oriental Republic of Uruguay.

In addition, Doura has composed music for ballets, art exhibitions and films, receiving the Best Score award at the 1985 New York University (NYU) Film Festival for his work on Commercial for Murder by director Amy Goldstein. In 2019, he again received the distinction of Best Argentine Premiere from the Argentine Music Critics Association for his composition Sueños de verano. Doura is a member of ASCAP and the National Academy of Recording Arts and Sciences (NARAS), the organization that holds the Grammy Awards. He is also a co-founder of PAMAR of New York, a non-profit organization for cultural exchange in the Americas; and, since 2020, he works as director of the audiovisual production company Franciscus Productions, which is based in Madrid.

Life and career

1957–2007: Education and early recognitions
Daniel Doura was born on 9 August 1957 in Buenos Aires, Argentina, into a family of music-loving industrialists. His father is one of the founders of the seaside resort town of Costa del Este, Buenos Aires Province. He began his musical studies in 1966, at the age of 9, taking guitar lessons with Clelia Sagreras. Doura later adopted the piano, an instrument he studied with Antonio de Raco in Argentina, Alberto Portugheis in the United Kingdom, and Jacqueline Gourdin and Alfred Churchill in the United States.

Between 1977 and 1987, Doura received musical training at leading American universities and conservatories, and was a student of renowned composers such as Hugo Norden, John Cage, Mario Davidovsky, Chou Wen-chung, Alberto Ginastera, Luciano Berio, Tōru Takemitsu, Theodore Antoniou, Milton Babbitt, John Adams, Seiji Ozawa and Fred Lerdahl, among others. He began his studies in Harmony and History at the Guildhall School of Music and Drama in London, but graduated with a Bachelor of Arts degree in Composition from the Boston Conservatory in (now associated with the Berklee College of Music) in 1982. Doura complemented this career with courses in electroacoustics directed by Barry Vercoe at the Massachusetts Institute of Technology in 1979, in addition to studying electronic music with Arthur Kreiger and other professors in New York between 1983 and 1986.

Between 1979 and 1982, Doura was a member of the Tanglewood Festival Chorus of the Boston Symphony Orchestra, while attending conducting courses with Rouben Gregorian and Colin Davis. Also, between 1983 and 1987, he completed a postgraduate degree in Arts and Sciences at the University of Columbia, New York. In 1985, he was awarded the first prize for composition by the American Society of Composers, Authors and Publishers (ASCAP) in New York and, a year later, he was a finalist in the composition competition of the American Academy of Arts and Sciences in Cambridge, Massachusetts. 

In addition, between 1979 and 1986, Doura composed music for films by directors Amy Goldstein, Rosemary Ricchio, Juan José Campanella (in the 1985 short film El contorsionista) and Gabriel García. For his work on the film Commercial for Murder directed by Goldstein, Doura received an award at the 1985 Film Festival of the University of Columbia.

Doura has also composed ballet music for the National Ballet of Venezuela (1984) and for choreographers  and Vicente Nebrada. His composition La pasión de Saverio (English: "The Passion of Saverio"), made in 2003 in memory of Roberto Arlt, was critically acclaimed after its premiere in Boston.

2008–present: Most recent compositions

In 2007, the composer premiered the symphonic poem Visiones patagónicas (English: "Patagonic Visions") at the Teatro Argentino de La Plata in La Plata, Buenos Aires Province. This composition was awarded with the distinction of Best Argentine Premiere of the year, awarded by the Argentine Music Critics Association (Spanish: Asociación de Críticos Musicales de la Argentina).

In 2008, Doura composed Sinfonía argentina (English: "Argentine Symphony") together with writer and poet . The symphonic work was conceived on the occasion of the Argentine Bicentennial celebrations, which began with that of the May Revolution in 2010 and ended with that of the Independence in 2016, is thematically centered on national identity of the country.  In an interview, Doura stated that "the idea is that it should serve as a meditation for all Argentines to find our identity again or perhaps even discovering it." Sinfonía argentina has been identified as one of the first choral symphonies composed in the 21st century. The symphonic-choral work is conceived in a classical manner, with a duration of 48 minutes and organized in four movements that correspond to poems composed by Roemmers: first movement "De la arena", second movement "Del mar", third movement "Del ser", and fourth movement "De los pueblos".

A first version of Sinfonía argentina premiered in 2011 at the Teatro Colón in Buenos Aires, with guest conductor , pianist Horacio Lavandera, guitarist César Angeleri and the Orfeón choir. Given the impossibility of recording the work in the country, Sinfonía argentina was recorded in Prague, Czech Republic in November 2015, performed by the Prague Metropolitan Orchestra and the Prague Chamber Choir and conducted by the Uruguayan Roberto Montenegro. The resulting CD was released in 2016 by the Uruguayan label Sondor. On April 28, 2017, the Embassy of the Oriental Republic of Uruguay in Argentina made a recognition to Doura, Roemmers and Montenegro, awarding the "Bicentennial Edition" Gold Disc distinction to the album. The event was declared of Cultural Interest by the Argentine Senate, in a statement that described Sinfonía argentina as "a first-rate artistic work".

Sinfonía Argentina had its world premiere in Europe, performed by the Czech National Symphony Orchestra and the Czech Philharmonic Choir of Brno in a series of performances conducted by Montenegro. The first of these presentations was on 18 October 2018 in the city of Teplice, Czech Republic, followed by Munich, Germany on October 21 and ending in Prague on November 3. Before the world premiere of the work, Doura and Roemmers visited 14 Argentine provinces to carry out the discussion "Sinfonía argentina. Importance of music and literature in national culture", passing through Córdoba, Mendoza, San Juan, Río Negro, Misiones, Neuquén, Salta, Jujuy, Buenos Aires and Tierra del Fuego. Sinfonía argentina had its Spanish premiere on 28 May 2022 as part of the Primavera Fest, held in the city of Ávila, Castilla y León. On October 27, 2022, Sinfonía argentina was performed at the National Auditorium of Music in Madrid in a benefit concert in favor of UNICEF, Fundación Querer and Scholas Occurrentes. 

In a 2016 article analyzing the history of classical music in Argentina from its origins to the present day, Lucio Bruno-Videla—current president of the Argentine Association of Composers—included Doura as one of the national composers who currently have international exposure, and related his work to that of the country's composers who preceded him:
Some of the numerous Argentine composers who today are internationally active are Esteban Benzecry (1970), Juan Manuel Abras (1975), Osvaldo Golijov (1960) and Daniel Doura (1957). In all of them one can perceive singularities linked to most of the previous ones, and even with conceptual characteristics (not necessarily stylistic) of the music of the American colonial Baroque, that is, the marked tendency to superimpose and juxtapose styles, techniques, etc. in ways different from those found in the works of hegemonic Europe. This continuity functions as a document of a true musical tradition of its own, a tradition understood as the continuity of a culture. These "ways of doing" characterize not only music, but the whole Latin American culture and are deeply rooted in the way of being, the language, the identities and a philosophical-cultural conception.

In addition, he composed the music for the exhibition "Federico.... Dónde estés", which brought together works inspired by Federico García Lorca and was held in October 2021 at the ArtexArte gallery, Buenos Aires. The composition accompanied readings of Lorca's poems by gallery owner Luz Castillo, in counterpoint with a projection of images.

On 4 March 2018, Doura premiered the work Sueños de verano (English: "Summer Dreams") at Jordan Hall of the New England Conservatory of Music, Boston, performed by the Boston Civic Symphony under the baton of Francisco Noya. On August 10 of the same year, the composition had its Argentine premiere at the Symphonic Hall of the Kirchner Cultural Center, Buenos Aires, performed by the Argentine National Symphony Orchestra and conducted by Gustavo Fontana. Sueños de verano received the award for Best Argentine Premiere of the year, awarded by the Argentine Music Critics Association.

Selected works

Awards and recognitions

See also

 
 Chronological list of Argentine classical composers
 List of 20th-century classical composers
 List of 21st-century classical composers
 List of Argentine classical composers

References

External links
 Official website
 Daniel Doura at Barry Editorial
 
 

Argentine composers
Argentine film score composers
1957 births
Living people
Male film score composers
People from Buenos Aires
20th-century Argentine artists
21st-century Argentine artists
20th-century composers
21st-century composers
20th-century male musicians
21st-century male musicians